Patricia Monaghan may refer to:
 Pat Monaghan, ecologist
 Patricia Monaghan, activist

See also

Patrick Monahan (born 1969) lead singer of Train.
 Patrick Monahan (comedian) (born 1976), Irish-Iranian comedian
 Patrick J. Monahan (born 1954), Canadian academic
 P. H. Moynihan (Patrick Henry Moynihan, 1869–1946), U.S. Representative from Illinois
 Daniel Patrick Moynihan (1927–2003), known as Pat, U.S. Senator from New York